The 2013 Commonwealth Weightlifting Championships were held at the Youth & Sport Complex in Batu Uban, Penang, Malaysia from 25 to 30 November 2013.

Results shown below are for the senior competition only. Junior and youth results are cited here and here respectively (all results also cited here).

Medal table

Medal summary

Men

Women

Medal reallocation

References

External links
Results book (Men)
Results book (Women)

Weightlifting competitions
Weightlifting
Commonwealth Weightlifting Championships
Commonwealth Weightlifting Championships
Commonwealth Weightlifting Championships
International sports competitions hosted by Malaysia
Weightlifting in Malaysia
Commonwealth Weightlifting Championships